Microctenochira is a genus of tortoise beetles in the family Chrysomelidae. There are at least 110 described species in the genus Microctenochira.

See also
 List of Microctenochira species

References

Further reading

 
 
 
 

Cassidinae
Articles created by Qbugbot